The first series of the children's television series Hi-5 aired between 12 April 1999 and 11 June 1999 on the Nine Network in Australia. The series was produced by Kids Like Us for Nine with Kris Noble as executive producer.

Production
Creator Helena Harris initially conceived Hi-5 in 1998 along with co-producer Posie Graeme-Evans, developing the series as entertainment for preschoolers. During her time living in England, Harris realised that children are the same around the world, and was inspired to create a children's series which would appeal globally. The creators believed that pre-schoolers were rapidly maturing beyond programs such as Here's Humphrey, and discovered that most children learned from shows which incorporated movement and song. They saw the need for television which was "life affirming", and believed that a child's imagination could be activated by television of good quality. The name of the series was derived from the high five gesture. 

Harris and Graeme-Evans pitched Hi-5 to the Nine Network through Kids Like Us, their joint independent production company. After auditions for the cast were held in June 1998, a pilot was produced, and shown to a test audience. No changes to the format were made after this test. The original cast consisted of Kellie Crawford (née Hoggart), Kathleen de Leon Jones, Nathan Foley, Tim Harding and Charli Robinson, who were aged between 19 and 25 at the time of the series' airing. After being commissioned, the first full series began production in October, and went to air on Nine in 1999. The series was produced for US$20,000 to US$30,000 for each episode.

Cast

Presenters
 Kellie Crawford – Word Play
 Kathleen de Leon Jones – Puzzles and Patterns
 Nathan Foley – Shapes in Space
 Tim Harding – Making Music
 Charli Robinson  – Body Move

Episodes

Home video releases

Awards and nominations

Notes

References

External links
 Hi-5 Website

1999 Australian television seasons